Brothers of the Borderland is a 2004 film directed by American filmmaker Julie Dash.  The film is on display as an immersive film experience at the National Underground Railroad Freedom Center in Cincinnati, Ohio.

Plot 
Brothers of the Borderland tells the story of a female slave who escapes to freedom with assistance from John Parker, a free black man, and Rev. John Rankin, a white minister. The 25-minute-long film features narration from Oprah Winfrey and displays in an immersive, experiential theater. The film takes place on the Kentucky-Ohio border and features a crossing of the Ohio River.

Cast
 Oprah Winfrey as Narrator

Critical reception
The Cincinnati Enquirer described the film as a "full sensory experience" inside a "tree-lined 'environmental' theater where fog rises from the floor and 'bullets' whiz by."

References 

2004 films
Films about American slavery
Films set in Kentucky
Films set in Ohio